The 2016–17 Russian National Football League was the 25th season of Russia's second-tier football league since the dissolution of the Soviet Union. The season began on 11 July 2016 and ended on 19 May 2017.

Teams

Stadiums, personnel and sponsorship

League table

Results

Statistics

Scoring
 First goal of the season: Vadim Minich for Luch-Energiya against Mordovia Saransk (11 July 2016)

Top goalscorers

Last updated: 21 May 2017

References

External links
Official website

2016–17 in Russian football leagues
Russian First League seasons
Rus